Eugene Miller may refer to:

 Eugene Miller (Texas politician), in Texas Senate, District 22
 Eugene Miller (Ohio politician), member of Cleveland City Council and former member of the Ohio House of Representatives

See also
Gene Miller (1928–2005), reporter
 Yevgeny Miller (1867–1939), Russian general, leader of White movement during Russian Civil War